Raush may refer to:

Irma Raush (b. 1938), Russian actress
Rivash, Iran, city in Iran

See also
Rausch (disambiguation)